Melton Highway (formerly Keilor–Melton Road) links Melbourne's outer north-western suburbs of Melton and Taylors Lakes (western Keilor as the old name suggests), connecting the Western Freeway and Calder Freeway to provide a more-direct route between Ballarat and Melbourne's northern airports (Tullamarine and Essendon); it has a Victorian route designation of C754.

Route
Melton Highway commences at the diamond interchange with Western Freeway and heads north as a four-lane, dual-carriageway road, intersecting shortly afterwards with High Street through central Melton, and then Gisborne-Melton Road, before narrowing back to a dual-lane, single-carriageway road heading east, sign-posted at 70 km/h as the road bends and dips to cross Kororoit Creek, increases to 80 km/h afterwards and then eventually to 100 km/h through Plumpton. The speed limit drops back to 80 km/h approaching Hillside, where the road widens to a four-lane, dual-carriageway and continues east through Sydenham and Taylors Lakes, past Watergardens Town Centre, to eventually terminate at the intersection with Sunshine Avenue in Keilor. Increases in traffic has seen the road upgraded with many overtaking lanes, and increasing residential levels at the eastern (Sydenham) end has seen further duplication of carriageways and reconstruction of the railway crossing just north of Sydenham (Watergardens) station.

History
The alignment of Keilor–Melton Road was altered at both ends through the 1980s:
its eastern end in Keilor, originally terminating with the Calder Highway (today Old Calder Highway) in northern Keilor, was truncated to terminate at Sunshine Avenue to provision new ramps to the Calder Freeway when the Keilor bypass opened in 1984; the former alignment is now known as Old Calder Highway
its western end in Melton, originally terminating with the Western Highway (today High Street) in central Melton, was re-aligned to terminate at a new interchange with the Western Freeway when the Melton bypass opened in 1987; the former alignment is now known as Melton Valley Drive and Sherwin Court

Keilor–Melton Road was signed as Metropolitan Route 54 between Melton and Keilor in 1989; with Victoria's conversion to the newer alphanumeric system in the late 1990s, this was replaced with route C754.

The passing of the Transport Act of 1983 (itself an evolution from the original Highways and Vehicles Act of 1924) provided for the declaration of State Highways, roads two-thirds financed by the State government through the Road Construction Authority (later VicRoads). The State Highway (Keilor-Melton Road) was declared a State Highway in November 1989, from Western Freeway in Melton to Sunshine Avenue in Taylors Lakes where it meets the ramps to the Calder Freeway, then re-declared as the Melton Highway just over a year later in December 1990, within the same alignment.

The passing of the Road Management Act 2004 granted the responsibility of overall management and development of Victoria's major arterial roads to VicRoads: in 2004, VicRoads re-declared Melton Highway (Arterial #6040) from Western Freeway in Melton to Sunshine Avenue in Taylors Lakes.

In September 2018, the former level crossing through the Sunbury/Bendigo railway line was replaced by a new 6-lane bridge overpass, with new bike lanes and footpaths on each side, and new paths underneath. The railway carries more than 200 trains each weekday and the road carries 38,000 vehicles per day.

Intersections

See also

 Highways in Australia
 Highways in Victoria
 List of highways in Melbourne

References

Highways and freeways in Melbourne
Transport in the City of Melton
Transport in the City of Brimbank